Bates Township is a civil township of Iron County in the U.S. state of Michigan.  As of the 2000 census, the township population was 1,021.

Geography

Demographics
As of the census of 2000, there were 1,021 people, 437 households, and 301 families residing in the township.  The population density was 8.1 per square mile (3.1/km2).  There were 803 housing units at an average density of 6.4 per square mile (2.5/km2).  The racial makeup of the township was 97.36% White, 0.10% African American, 1.57% Native American, 0.10% Asian, 0.20% from other races, and 0.69% from two or more races. Hispanic or Latino of any race were 0.69% of the population. 15.5% were of Swedish, 12.2% Polish, 11.8% Italian, 11.1% German, 8.9% English, 8.2% Finnish, 7.0% Irish and 6.0% French ancestry according to Census 2000.

There were 437 households, out of which 25.9% had children under the age of 18 living with them, 59.5% were married couples living together, 4.6% had a female householder with no husband present, and 30.9% were non-families. 27.5% of all households were made up of individuals, and 14.9% had someone living alone who was 65 years of age or older.  The average household size was 2.34 and the average family size was 2.81.

In the township the population was spread out, with 22.0% under the age of 18, 6.3% from 18 to 24, 22.1% from 25 to 44, 27.4% from 45 to 64, and 22.1% who were 65 years of age or older.  The median age was 45 years. For every 100 females, there were 100.6 males.  For every 100 females age 18 and over, there were 99.5 males.

The median income for a household in the township was $31,983, and the median income for a family was $41,094. Males had a median income of $27,375 versus $21,307 for females. The per capita income for the township was $19,194.  About 3.6% of families and 7.1% of the population were below the poverty line, including 13.9% of those under age 18 and 0.9% of those age 65 or over.

References

Townships in Iron County, Michigan
Townships in Michigan